The Macau Economic and Cultural Office is the representative office of Macau in the Republic of China. Its counterpart body in Macau is the Taipei Economic and Cultural Office in Macau.

The office is located at Taipei 101 in Xinyi District, Taipei.

Objectives
The purpose of the office is to provide services and assistance to Macau residents who work, study, travel, conduct business, live or may encounter emergencies in Taiwan. It also promotes exchanges and cooperation between Macau and Taiwan in trade, tourism, technology, environmental protection, education, health, cultural activities, academic publishing, technical specialty, social welfare and other areas.

History
On 13 May 2012, Lai celebrated the opening ceremony of Macau Economic and Cultural Office in Taiwan. Lai was accompanied by Cheong U, Secretary for Social Affairs and Culture of the Macau SAR. Lai added that the office establishment resulted from the principle of goodwill and reciprocity held by both sides and it was considered a milestone in the development for bilateral relation between Taiwan and Macau. On 16 June 2021, the office announced it will suspend its operation indefinitely starting 19 June 2021.

Director
 Leung Kit Chi

Transportation
The office is accessible within walking distance South of Taipei City Hall Station of the Taipei Metro.

See also
 Foreign relations of Macau
 List of diplomatic missions in Taiwan
 Cross-Strait relations
 One-China policy
 Hong Kong Economic, Trade and Cultural Office

References

External links
  

2012 establishments in Taiwan
2021 disestablishments in Taiwan
Macau–Taiwan relations
Macau Economic and Trade Office
Representative Offices in Taipei
Government agencies established in 2012
Government agencies disestablished in 2021
Defunct diplomatic missions